Antoine Choueiri (August 3, 1939 – March 9, 2010) was a billionaire Lebanese media executive. He was the founder of Choueiri Group, the Middle East's largest media broker.

Life
Choueiri was born in Beirut in 1939 to a Maronite Christian family from Bsharri. He married his wife Rose Salameh in 1961, who gave birth to two children.

Choueiri died on March 9, 2010, of health complications. He is buried in his ancestral home of Bsharri. In his honor one of Bsharri's main streets will be named "Antoine Choueiri" in homage to him and his achievements.

Choueiri Group 
At the height of its powers, the company that he founded, the Choueiri Group, controlled (through Choueiri's companies: Arabian Media Services International, MEMS, Arabian Outdoor, Times International, Audio Visual Media, C Media, Press Media, Digital Media Services, Interadio, Promofair, AMC and SECOMM) the flow of advertising for the following enterprises:

Television
Arabic entertainment: Arabia Drama, MBC Masr
General entertainment: MBC1, Al Watan TV Kuwait, LBCI, Dubai TV, Sama Dubai TV
Indian and Western entertainment: MBC2, MBC4, Dubai One, MBC Action, MBC MAX, MBC Bollywood
News channels: Al Arabiya, Al Arabiya Al-Hadath
Music channels: Melody Hits, Mazzika, Zoom, Wanasah, Melody FM
Kids' channels: MBC3
Sports & youth channels: Dubai Sports Channel, Dubai Racing Channel

Outdoor
Mupis (MUPI market leader in the GCC with a total of 12880 faces)
LamPosts (The LamPost sign is a backlit double sided panel. It displays a high-grade flexface printed poster with an image size of 1 M x 3 M.)
Megacoms (single or double-sided stand size: 3M X 4M)
Unipolses: frontlit or backlit (large format with sizes up to 18 M x 6 M, with the advertising message printed in digital technology on flexible vinyl material)

Newspapers
UAE: Al Bayan (the official Arabic newspaper of Dubai), Emarat Al Youm, Emirates Business 247.com, Al Hayat (the "International Arabic Daily Newspaper") 
Lebanon: An-Nahar Arabic Daily, L'Orient Le Jour, As-Safir, Al Hayat 
KSA: Al Yaum

Magazines
Lebanon: Noun (Lebanon's leading French monthly women's magazine), Commerce Du Levant (Lebanon's leading French monthly business magazine), Santé Beauté (French beauty and health magazine), L'orient Junior (monthly French teenage magazine)
Kuwait: Samra Magazine (launched in 1993, a family oriented, society, fashion and lifestyle monthly magazine)
Pan-Arab: Jamalouki (an Arabic language monthly magazine, circulated in Arab countries; targets Arab women), Al Hadath Al Riyadi (an Arabic language specialized sports monthly magazine, circulated in Arab countries), Laha Magazine (launched in September 2000, a pan-Arab weekly family magazine), Ara Magazine (launched in October 2011 as the first and only magazine published by the media body of the government of Dubai, DMI)

Radio
Lebanon: Radio One, Mix FM, Light FM, Radio Liban Libre, Melody FM
Pan-Arab: MBC FM, Panorama FM, Noor Dubai FM, Hala FM, Hi FM

Internet

Actionha.net
Alarabiya.net
Albayan.ae
Anghami App
Annahar.com
Arabia.Eurosport.com
Cinescape.com
Daralhayat.com
Emaratalyoum.com
Emirates247.com
Gheir.com
Hawaaworld.com
Jamalouki.net
Kooora.com
Lahamag.com
Lorientlejour.com
MBC.net
MBC3.net
Nawa3em.com
Ounousa.com
Sabq.org
Shahid.net

Cinema
Cinescape Cinescape manages all cinema halls in Kuwait.

References

1939 births
2010 deaths
Lebanese Maronites
Businesspeople from Beirut
Lebanese mass media owners
People from Bsharri